Satellite emergency position-indicating radiobeacon station (sort: SEPIRS) is – according to article 1.94 of the International Telecommunication Union's (ITU) ITU Radio Regulations (RR) – defined as «An earth station in the mobile-satellite service the emissions of which are intended to facilitate search and rescue (SAR) operations.»

Each radio station shall be classified by the radiocommunication service in which it operates permanently or temporarily.

See also
Emergency position-indicating radiobeacon station
Radio station
Radiocommunication service

References / sources 

 International Telecommunication Union (ITU)

Radio stations and systems ITU
Maritime communication